The Tioga Inn in Chanute, Kansas was built in 1929.  Over the years it has also been known as The Tioga Hotel, as The Tioga, and as The Jones' Building.  It was listed on the National Register of Historic Places in 1990.

It is a six-story 100-room hotel which dominates over the skyline of Chanute.

It was recently purchased and is undergoing renovations. Please see https://tiogatower.com/ for updates. 

It was designed and constructed by Chanute contractor John W. Pratt.

References

Hotel buildings on the National Register of Historic Places in Kansas
Buildings and structures completed in 1929
Neosho County, Kansas
Hotels in Kansas